The men's decathlon event at the 2004 World Junior Championships in Athletics was held in Grosseto, Italy, at Stadio Olimpico Carlo Zecchini on 14 and 15 July.  Junior implements (valid until 2005) were used, i.e. 106.7 cm (3'6) (senior implement) hurdles, as well as 6 kg shot and 1.75 kg discus.

Medalists

Results

Final
14/15 July

Participation
According to an unofficial count, 24 athletes from 16 countries participated in the event.

References

Decathlon
Combined events at the World Athletics U20 Championships